is a railway station in the city of Mino, Gifu Prefecture, Japan, operated by the third sector railway operator Nagaragawa Railway.

Lines

Station layout
Suhara Station has one ground-level side platform serving a single bi-directional track. There is no station building, but only a weather shelter on the platform. The station is unattended.

Adjacent stations

|-
!colspan=5|Nagaragawa Railway

History
Operations were transferred from the Japan National Railway (JNR) to the Nagaragawa Railway on December 11, 1986. The station was renamed to its present name on that date

Surrounding area

Suhara Post Office

See also
 List of Railway Stations in Japan

References

External links

 

Railway stations in Japan opened in 1957
Railway stations in Gifu Prefecture
Stations of Nagaragawa Railway
Mino, Gifu